St. Mary's, officially named the Municipality of the District of St. Mary's, is a district municipality in Guysborough County, Nova Scotia, Canada. Statistics Canada classifies the district municipality as a municipal district.

The district municipality occupies the western half of the county and its administrative seat is in the village of Sherbrooke.

Demographics 

Electoral districts
The district municipality is divided into seven electoral districts for municipal representation:

 Sherbrooke & Area
 Ecum Secum & Area
 Caledonia & Area
 Sonora - Port Hilford 
 Goshen & Area
 Liscomb & Area
 Port Bickerton & Area

See also
 List of municipalities in Nova Scotia

References

External links

District municipalities in Nova Scotia
Communities in Guysborough County, Nova Scotia